The Glenn Gould School is a centre for the training of professional musicians in performance at post-secondary and post-bachelor levels in Toronto, Ontario, Canada. The school was founded in 1987 and renamed in 1997 after the celebrated pianist, Glenn Gould, who was born and lived in Toronto and was an alumnus of The Royal Conservatory of Music. It is considered one of the top music conservatories in North America, and the world. The school is located in the facilities of The Royal Conservatory of Music and is in the Yorkville neighbourhood of Downtown Toronto.  It is located adjacent to the Royal Ontario Museum and near the University of Toronto.

Origin
The school was founded in 1987 as The Royal Conservatory of Music Professional School by The Royal Conservatory of Music in Toronto.  The school was renamed 1 January 1997 to The Glenn Gould School "to honour one of the greatest musical minds in history".

See also

Music of Canada
List of Canadian composers
Royal Conservatory of Music

References

External links
The Glenn Gould School

Educational institutions established in 1987
Music schools in Canada
Classical music in Canada
Performing arts in Toronto
Glenn Gould
Universities and colleges in Toronto
1987 establishments in Ontario